Clase is a suburban district of the City and County of Swansea, Wales within the Mynydd-Bach ward.  Clase approximates to the housing area south of Clasemont Road between Morriston and Llangyfelach.

History
Clasemont was the home and therefore territorial designation of Sir John Morris, 1st Baronet who founded Morriston, Swansea on the basis of copper-smelting, brass manufacture, tin-plating and coal mining - coal is a major local mineral and copper was imported from other parts of Wales and from Cornwall.  Before then, Morriston was a rural and woodland part of Llangyfelach.

Landmarks
The 16-storey Driver and Vehicle Licensing Agency building is on top of the hill on which Clase rests and is visible from several miles away.

Clase from the 1960s until 2000s had a number of high rise tower blocks thereafter replaced by various uses such as low rise housing, a multi-use sports pitch and an open green.

Planning policies
Clase is in a Communities First area together with Caemawr under the designation of Clase & Caemawr Communities First Partnership.

References

External links
Communities First - Clase and Caemawr

Districts of Swansea